Louis Napoléon Bonaparte (born Luigi Buonaparte; 2 September 1778 – 25 July 1846) was a younger brother of Napoleon I, Emperor of the French. He was a monarch in his own right from 1806 to 1810, ruling over the Kingdom of Holland (a French client state roughly corresponding to the modern-day Kingdom of the Netherlands). In that capacity he was known as Louis I (Dutch: Lodewijk I ).

Louis was the fifth surviving child and fourth surviving son of Carlo Buonaparte and Letizia Ramolino, out of eight children who lived past infancy. He and his siblings were all born on Corsica, which had been conquered by France less than a decade before his birth. Louis followed his older brothers into the French Army, where he benefited from Napoleon's patronage. In 1802, he married his step-niece Hortense de Beauharnais, the daughter of Empress Joséphine (Napoleon's wife).

In 1806, Napoleon established the Kingdom of Holland in place of the Batavian Republic, appointing Louis as the new king. Napoleon had intended for Holland to be little more than a puppet state, but Louis was determined to be as independent as possible, and in fact became quite popular amongst his new people. Growing tired of his brother's wilfulness, Napoleon annexed Holland into the French Empire in 1810, and Louis went into exile.

His youngest son, Louis-Napoléon, established the Second French Empire in 1852, proclaiming himself Napoleon III.

Early life
Louis was born in Ajaccio, Corsica. He was a younger brother of Joseph, Napoleon, Lucien, and Elisa Bonaparte, and the older brother of Pauline, Caroline, and Jérôme Bonaparte. Louis' godparents were the island's governor, Mr de Marbeuf and the wife of the intendant, Bertrand de Boucheporn, whom Letizia and her husband, Carlo, had befriended.

Louis Bonaparte's early career was spent in the Army, and he served with Napoleon in Egypt. Thanks to his older brother, Napoleon, Louis was given a commission in the French Military, and was promoted to Lieutenant in the 4th Artillery Regiment, and from there he was made Aide de Camp on Napoleon's staff. Napoleon, during his Italian Campaign, recommended Louis to Carnot, and Louis was consequently made a captain. He later became a General by the age of 25, although he himself felt that he had risen too high in too short a time.

Upon Louis's return to France, he was involved in Napoleon's plot to overthrow the Directory. After becoming the First Consul, Napoleon arranged for a marriage between Louis and Hortense de Beauharnais, the daughter of Empress Josephine, and hence Napoleon's stepdaughter. Hortense, who was opposed to the marriage at first, was persuaded by her mother to marry Louis for the sake of the family, and she did so.

Louis supposedly suffered from periods of mental illness. These periods of depression or mental instability (records fail to distinguish) would plague Louis until his death.

King of Holland (1806–1810)

Feeling that the Batavian Republic was too independent for his liking, Napoleon replaced it with the Kingdom of Holland on 5 June 1806, and placed Louis on the throne. Napoleon had intended for his younger brother to be little more than a French prefect of Holland. However, Louis had his own mind, and tried to be a responsible and independent ruler. In an effort to endear himself to his adopted country, he tried to learn the Dutch language; he called himself Lodewijk I (adopting the Dutch form of his name) and declared himself Dutch rather than French. Allegedly, his Dutch was initially so poor that he told the people he was the Konijn van 'Olland ("Rabbit of 'Olland"), rather than Koning van Holland ("King of Holland"). However, his sincere effort to learn Dutch earned him some respect from his subjects.

Having declared himself Dutch, Louis tried to make his court Dutch as well. He forced his court and ministers (mostly provided by Napoleon) to speak only Dutch, and also to renounce their French citizenships. This latter was too much for his wife Hortense who, in France at the time of his demands, refused his request. Louis and Hortense had never gotten along, and this demand further strained their relationship. She only came to Holland reluctantly, and deliberately tried to avoid Louis as much as possible.

Louis could never settle on the location for his capital city while he was in Holland. He changed capitals over a dozen times, trying Amsterdam, The Hague, Utrecht, and other places. On one occasion, after visiting the home of a wealthy Dutch merchant, he liked the place so much that he had the owner evicted so he could take up residence there. Then, Louis moved again after seven weeks. His constant moving kept the court in upheaval since they had to follow him everywhere. The European diplomatic corps went so far as to petition Bonaparte to remain in one place so they could keep up with him. This restlessness was later attributed to his alleged "lunacy".

Hortense bore Louis's sons Napoléon Charles Bonaparte and Napoléon Louis Bonaparte in Paris, while Louis was in Holland. In 1806, Louis called for his son to be sent to him in Holland, but he was again refused by Hortense, who believed that her son would never be returned to France. When Louis appealed to his brother Napoleon for help, Napoleon sided with Hortense. Napoleon kept the boy in his own court, and he even had him named the heir to the French throne prior to the birth of his own son.

Two major tragedies occurred during the reign of Louis Bonaparte: the explosion of a cargo ship loaded with gunpowder in the heart of the city of Leiden in 1807, and a major flood in Holland in 1809. In both instances, Louis personally and effectively oversaw local relief efforts, which helped earn him the title of Louis the Good. Napoleon appeared disappointed and commented: ″Brother, when they say of some king or other that he is good, it means that he has failed in his rule.″

Louis Bonaparte's reign was short-lived due to two factors. The first was that Napoleon wanted to reduce the value of French loans from Dutch investors by two-thirds, meaning a serious economic blow to the Netherlands. The second factor was the one that became the pretext for Napoleon's demand of Louis's abdication. As Napoleon was preparing an army for his invasion of Russia, he wanted troops from the entire region under his control, the allied border countries. This included troops from the Netherlands. Louis, confronted by his brother's demand, refused point-blank. Napoleon then accused Louis of putting Dutch interests above those of France, and removed most of the French forces in Holland for the coming war in the east, leaving only about 9,000 garrison soldiers in the country. Unfortunately for Louis, the English landed an army of 40,000 in 1809 in an attempt to capture Antwerp and Flushing. With Louis unable to defend his realm, France sent 80,000 militiamen, commanded by future King of Sweden Jean-Baptiste Bernadotte and successfully repelled the invasion. Napoleon then suggested that Louis should abdicate, citing Louis's inability to protect Holland as a reason. Louis refused and declared the occupation of the Kingdom by a French army as unlawful. On 1 July 1810 Louis abdicated in favor of his second son, Napoleon Louis Bonaparte. He fled from Haarlem on 2/3 July and settled in Austria. Oudinot invaded Holland on 4 July. Napoleon annexed Holland to France by the Decree of Rambouillet on 9 July.

Exile

After his abdication, Louis Bonaparte assumed the title of Count of Saint-Leu (comte de Saint-Leu), which was a reference to his property at Saint-Leu-la-Forêt near Paris. He was appointed as the Constable of France in 1808, a strictly honorary title.

After his Dutch kingdom was taken away from him, the Austrian Emperor Francis I offered him asylum. Between 1811 and 1813, he found refuge in Graz, where he turned to writing and poetry. Louis wrote to Napoleon after the latter's defeat in Russia to request that the Dutch throne be restored to him; however, Napoleon refused. His request to visit the Netherlands was denied several times by King William I of the Netherlands, but King William II allowed him a visit in 1840. Although traveling in the Netherlands under a false name, some people found out that it was their former king, which led to a cheering crowd gathering under the window of his hotel room. It is said that he was quite moved by this demonstration of affection from his former subjects.

After the death of his eldest brother Joseph in 1844, Louis was seen by the Bonapartists as the rightful Emperor of the French, although Louis took little action himself to advance the claim. Louis's son and heir, the future Emperor Napoleon III, on the other hand, was at that time being imprisoned in France for having attempted a Bonapartist coup d'état.

Louis Bonaparte died on 25 July 1846 in Livorno, and his remains were buried at Saint-Leu-la-Forêt, Île-de-France.

Marriage and children

Louis was married on 4 January 1802 to Hortense de Beauharnais, the daughter of the deceased general Alexandre, Vicomte de Beauharnais and his wife Josephine Tascher de la Pagerie. Josephine was the first wife of Louis's brother Napoleon. Thus Hortense was also Louis's step-niece.

This marriage had been forced upon them and was rather loveless, though they supposedly consummated it and interacted often enough to produce three sons. As a rule, the Bonapartes, with the exception of Napoleon, loathed the Beauharnaises. Hortense also certainly had extra-marital lovers.

Hortense de Beauharnais gave birth to three sons which were officially claimed by Louis Bonaparte, despite his own doubts about their paternity:
 Napoleon Charles Bonaparte, born 10 October 1802, Prince Royal of Holland. When he died on 5 May 1807 at 4½ years of age, his body lay in state at Notre Dame Cathedral in Paris. He is buried at Saint-Leu-La-Foret, Ile-de-France.
 Napoleon Louis Bonaparte, born 11 October 1804. Became Prince Royal of Holland on his brother's death, and was King for eight days in 1810, between his father's abdication (1 July) and the fall of Holland to Napoleon Bonaparte's invading army (9 July). Sovereign of the Grand Duchy of Berg in 1809-1813 (under regency). Napoleon Louis Bonaparte died from measles on 17 March 1831, and his remains were buried at Saint-Leu-La-Foret, Île-de-France.
 Charles Louis-Napoleon Bonaparte, (1808–73). Born in Paris, he was the third and last son, and became Sovereign of Second French Empire (1852–1870) as Emperor Napoleon III.

References

Further reading 
 

1778 births
1846 deaths
Louis Bonaparte
French people of Italian descent
Military personnel from Ajaccio
Knights of the Golden Fleece of Spain
Louis Bonaparte
Louis Bonaparte
Roman Catholic monarchs
People of the Patriottentijd
French Roman Catholics
Dutch Roman Catholics
Louis Bonaparte
Napoleon III
People of the Kingdom of Holland
Parents of presidents of France
Military governors of Paris
Names inscribed under the Arc de Triomphe